Jonathan Richard Gagiano (born 4 October 1985 in Cape Town) is a South African born, American rugby union player. 
Gagiano plays flanker for the USA Eagle XV side. His debut for the USA Eagles XV was in 2008 against Uruguay. He was selected to tour with the USA Eagles squad for the Autumn 2010 tour of Europe. He was a member of the USA rugby team that participated in the 2011 Rugby World Cup.

Club
Gagiano played in the Varsity Cup for the University of Cape Town side known as the Ikey Tigers from 2008 to 2010.
In March 2012 Gagiano signed with the Golden Lions for the remainder of the 2012 season.

References

External links
 Player Profile eaglesxv.com
 JJ Gagiano at ESPN Scrum

1985 births
Living people
American rugby union players
South African rugby union players
Rugby union flankers
United States international rugby union players
Rugby union number eights
Rugby union players from Cape Town
Golden Lions players
Western Province (rugby union) players
South African people of Italian descent